Harpersville is a town in Shelby County, Alabama, United States. According to the 1950 U.S. Census, it formally incorporated in 1943. At the 2020 census the population was 1,614, compared to 1,637 in 2010 and 1,620 in 2000. It is located southeast of the Birmingham metro area.

History
Harpersville was settled just after the War of 1812 ended.  It was originally called Big Springs.

Harpersville Municipal Court has been effectively taken over by Circuit Court Judge Hub Harrington as of 13 July 2012 in a case regarding Private probation. His order characterizes the municipal court as a debtors' prison and extortion racket condoned by the elected officials of Harpersville and Judicial Correction Services.

Harpersville has two structures which are listed on the National Register of Historic Places, the Chancellor House and the Old Rock House.

Datcher Family Farm Museum
The history of the Datcher's Harpersville farm dates back to before the end of slavery. It tells the story of family and Black ownership throughout American history. The trees on the farm have been around for three centuries. A small, white farmhouse serves as the Datcher family farm museum; the walls are replete with images of family photos paying homage to the Datcher legacy.

Geography
Harpersville is located in the eastern part of Shelby County at  (33.325848, -86.426121). The town is located at the intersection of US Routes 280 and 231. US 280 runs east to west through the town, leading west 12 mi (19 km) to Chelsea and 30 mi (48 km) to downtown Birmingham. US 280 and 231 run southeast together 7 mi (11 km) to Childersburg. US 231 runs northeast 21 mi (34 km) to Pell City.

Demographics

2000 Census
As of the census of 2000, there were 1,620 people, 610 households, and 458 families residing in the town. The racial makeup of the town was 69.57% White, 28.70% Black or African American, 0.49% Native American, 0.68% Asian, 0.25% from other races, and 0.31% from two or more races. 0.62% of the population were Hispanic or Latino of any race.

There were 610 households, out of which 33.9% had children under the age of 18 living with them, 57.4% were married couples living together, 14.8% had a female householder with no husband present, and 24.8% were non-families. 21.8% of all households were made up of individuals, and 9.2% had someone living alone who was 65 years of age or older. The average household size was 2.66 and the average family size was 3.10.

In the town, the population was spread out, with 27.3% under the age of 18, 7.5% from 18 to 24, 30.0% from 25 to 44, 23.0% from 45 to 64, and 12.3% who were 65 years of age or older. The median age was 37 years. For every 100 females, there were 93.5 males. For every 100 females age 18 and over, there were 87.6 males.

The median income for a household in the town was $31,655, and the median income for a family was $34,632. Males had a median income of $28,839 versus $22,069 for females. The per capita income for the town was $12,783. About 17.4% of families and 19.3% of the population were below the poverty line, including 23.6% of those under age 18 and 24.1% of those age 65 or over.

2010 Census
As of the census of 2010, there were 1,637 people, 620 households, and 456 families residing in the town. The racial makeup of the town was 73.1% White, 23.5% Black or African American, 0.3% Native American, 0.7% Asian, 1.0% from other races, and 1.3% from two or more races. 2.6% of the population were Hispanic or Latino of any race.

There were 620 households, out of which 26.5% had children under the age of 18 living with them, 51.5% were married couples living together, 16.9% had a female householder with no husband present, and 26.5% were non-families. 21.1% of all households were made up of individuals, and 9.3% had someone living alone who was 65 years of age or older. The average household size was 2.64 and the average family size was 3.09.

In the town, the population was spread out, with 23.1% under the age of 18, 8.9% from 18 to 24, 22.9% from 25 to 44, 30.2% from 45 to 64, and 14.8% who were 65 years of age or older. The median age was 41.7 years. For every 100 females, there were 91.5 males. For every 100 females age 18 and over, there were 95.0 males.

The median income for a household in the town was $37,768, and the median income for a family was $42,065. Males had a median income of $43,301 versus $32,434 for females. The per capita income for the town was $20,170. About 23.9% of families and 28.4% of the population were below the poverty line, including 55.3% of those under age 18 and 23.4% of those age 65 or over.

2020 Census

As of the 2020 United States census, there were 1,614 people, 562 households, and 433 families residing in the town. Harpersville is growing due to the suburban spread along Highway 280; however, the most recent Census in 2020 indicates a slight decrease in population below that of the Census of 2000.

Government
The mayor is Theoangelo Perkins. The previous mayor was Don Greene, and the two have traded this position back and forth for many election cycles.

School
The town of Harpersville does not have schools within town limits. All public matriculated students attend schools in the adjacent town of Vincent.

Coosa Valley Academy, part of the Alabama Independent School Association, serves as one of the private schools in the town of Harpersville. The doors of the school first opened in 1970 where it has served the community for 50 years. The School's mission statement says, "The vision of Coosa Valley Academy is to provide a college preparatory education in a safe and orderly Christian environment that will instill in each student the desire to fulfill his or her greatest academic potential while encouraging mutual respect among students and staff in order to prepare well-rounded individuals for success in life". Education is available for students in grades from Pre-Kindergarten through Twelfth grade. Dual enrollment programs are available for students in grades 10-12 allowing them the opportunity to take online classes at Troy University to earn college credits. A variety of clubs are available for student participation consisting of Athletics, Beta Club, Cheerleading Squad, Dance Team, Fellowship of Christian Athletes, History Club, Spanish Club, Student Government Association, and Ignite Club. Athletics available are baseball, basketball, football, soccer, softball, and volleyball. The current enrollment at Coosa Valley Academy stands at 250 students under supervision of 22 teachers. The student teacher ratio stands at 11:1 which grants educators the ability to work closely with the students.

Notable people
 Warren Kidd, NBA Player
 George McGinnis, NBA Player
 William Joseph Simmons, founder of the second Ku Klux Klan
 Henry B. Walthall, Actor - Star on Hollywood Walk of Fame

Landmarks
Klein-Wallace Home

Gallery

References

Sources

External links
 Town of Harpersville

Towns in Shelby County, Alabama
Towns in Alabama
Birmingham metropolitan area, Alabama